James or Jim White may refer to:

Military
 James White (general) (1747–1821), American pioneer; founded Knoxville, Tennessee
 James White (RAF officer) (1893–1972), World War I fighter ace

Politics

Australian politics
 James White (South Australian politician) (1820–1892), land agent and MHA
 James White (New South Wales politician) (1828–1890), member of Legislative Assembly, then Council; racehorse owner
 James Cobb White (1855–1927), New South Wales politician, member of Legislative Council, nephew of the above
 James Wharton White (1857–1930), MHA in South Australia

UK politics
 James White (English politician) (1809–1883), MP for Plymouth and Brighton
 Martin White (politician) (James Martin White, 1857–1928), businessman and Member of Parliament for Forfar
 J. D. White (James Dundas White, 1866–1951), Member of Parliament for Dunbartonshire and Glasgow Tradeston
 James White (Scottish politician) (1922–2009), MP for Glasgow Pollok
 James White (Irish politician) (1938–2014), Irish businessman, hotelier and politician

US politics
 James White (North Carolina politician) (1749–1809), Congressman from North Carolina
 James White (Maine politician) (1792–1870), Maine State Treasurer, 1842–1846
 James Bain White (1835–1897), U.S. Representative from Indiana
 James T. White (politician) (1837–1892), African-American Baptist minister and politician from Arkansas
 James Bamford White (1842–1931), U.S. Representative from Kentucky
 James Stephen White (1838–1908), politician from Milwaukee, Wisconsin
 James F. White (born 1941), American politician
 Jim White (politician) (born 1944), member of the South Dakota Senate
 James White (Texas politician) (born 1964), member of Texas House of Representatives
 James White (New Mexico politician), member of the New Mexico House of Representatives

Religion
 James White (Archdeacon of Armagh) (died 1530)
 James Springer White (1821–1881), husband of Ellen G. White and co-founder of the Seventh-day Adventist Church
 James Edson White (1849–1928), adventist and author, son of James Springer White and Ellen G. White
James Rowland White (c. 1851–1885), self-proclaimed prophet
 James Emery White (born 1961), president of Gordon-Conwell Theological Seminary
 James White (theologian) (born 1962), American theologian

Sports

American football
 Jim White (American football) (1920–1987), American football tackle for the New York Giants
 James White (defensive tackle) (born 1953), former NFL defensive/nose tackle for the Minnesota Vikings
 James White (running back) (born 1992), former NFL running back for the New England Patriots

Association football
 James White (Scottish footballer) (1899–1983), Scottish footballer
 Jimmy White (Irish footballer) (fl. 1923–1969), Irish international football (soccer) player
 Jimmy White (footballer, born 1942) (1942–2017), English football (soccer) player

Australian rules football
 Jim White (footballer, born 1878) (1878–1956), Australian rules footballer for Essendon in 1897
 Jim White (footballer, born 1922) (1922–2006), Australian rules footballer
 James White (Australian footballer) (born 1980), Australian rules footballer for Richmond

Basketball
 Jim White (basketball), American basketball player fl. 1940s
 James White (basketball) (born 1982), American basketball player
 James White (basketball, born 1993), American basketball player

Rugby union
 Jim White (rugby union), Australian rugby union player
 Jimmy White (rugby union) (1911–1997), South African rugby union player

Other sports
 Jim White (wrestler) (1942–2010), wrestler in the Southern United States
 James White, known as Deacon White (1847–1939), baseball player
 James L. White (coach) (1893–1949), American college baseball, basketball and football head coach
 Jim White (cricketer) (1901–1964), Australian cricketer
 James White (baseball), American Negro league baseball player
 James White (cross-country) (born 1941), American high school cross country coach
 Jimmy White (born 1962), English snooker player

Arts and media
 James White (writer and translator) (1759–1799), historical novelist
 James White (sculptor) (1861–1918), English-born sculptor who emigrated to Australia
 James H. White (1872–1944), Canadian film pioneer
 James White (author) (1928–1999), writer of science fiction novellas, short stories, and novels
 James L. White (poet) (1936–1981), poet and author
 James C. White (1937–2009), American radio talk show host
 James P. White (writer) (born 1940), author and editor
 James L. White (1947–2015), American screenwriter
 Jimmy White (singer) (born 1955), American singer-songwriter and record producer
 Jim White (journalist) (1957), British sports television announcer and journalist, now with STV
 Jim White (guitarist) (born 1957), American southern singer/songwriter
 Jim White (presenter) (born 1957) Scottish sports television announcer and journalist
 Jim White (drummer) (born 1962), Australian drummer for Dirty Three
 James Chance or James White (born 1963), American musician 
 James White (rapper), American rapper with German hip-hop group C-Block
 James Gordon White, screenwriter

Others
 James White (1775–1820), advertising agent and author
 James White (1812–1884), Scottish lawyer and chemicals manufacturer
 James Terry White (1845–1920), editor of The National Cyclopaedia of American Biography
 James Landrum White (1847–1925), shape note singing teacher and composer
 James White (geographer) (1863–1928), Canadian geographer
 James White (financier) (1877–1927), English property speculator
 James Larkin White (1882–1946), discoverer and explorer of Carlsbad Caverns
 James White (art expert) (1913–2003), Irish art expert and author
 James Boyd White (born 1938), American law professor, literary critic, scholar and philosopher
 James J. White (born 1934), law professor, legal scholar
 James White (engineer) (1938–2009), American polymer scientist
 James Clarke White (dermatologist) (1833–1916), American dermatologist and professor at Harvard Medical School
 James Clarke White (neurosurgeon) (died 1981), American neurosurgeon and professor at Harvard Medical School
 Jimmy White, a member of the gang that committed the Great Train Robbery

Other uses
 James White (film), a 2015 drama

See also
James Whyte (disambiguation)